Siragadikka Aasai is a 1994 Indian Tamil-language comedy drama film directed by Vijayachandran. The film stars Sivakumar, Vijayakumar, Manjula Vijayakumar and newcomer Zeenat, with Rajeev, Jeeva and Chinni Jayanth in supporting roles. It was released on 14 January 1994.

Plot 

Balu (Vijayakumar) and Padma (Manjula Vijayakumar) are a happily married couple and they have a teenage daughter Manju (Zeenat). One day, Manju receives a love letter from an unknown person. Balu hates love and wants to punish the letter sender. Her parents take the help of their neighbour Shiva (Sivakumar) to find the anonymous lover. Shiva is married to Sukanya (Jeeva) and they have a little boy (Master Vijay). What transpires later forms the crux of the story.

Cast 

Sivakumar as Shiva
Vijayakumar as Balu
Manjula Vijayakumar as Padma
Zeenat as Manju
Rajeev as Inspector Dhayalan
Jeeva as Sukanya
Chinni Jayanth as Rangu
Loose Mohan
Oru Viral Krishna Rao
Lakshmi
Pratibha
Sasi as Raja
Master Vijay

Soundtrack 

The film score and the soundtrack were composed by Manoj Saran. The soundtrack, released in 1994, features 5 tracks with lyrics written by Vairamuthu, Muthulingam and Vijayachandran.

Reception
The Indian Express wrote "The story is a little different (Gita) and for a first film is to the director's credit that he has tried out something different in the scenes he has incorporated in the screenplay. But of course it is his first work and it shows".

References 

1994 films
1990s Tamil-language films
1994 directorial debut films
Indian coming-of-age films
1990s coming-of-age films